"Hope of the Ages" is a song performed by Hillsong Worship, Reuben Morgan and Cody Carnes. The song was released as the lead single to Hillsong Worship's album, These Same Skies, on 20 August 2021. The song was written by Cody Carnes and Reuben Morgan. Jason Ingram and Brooke Ligertwood handled the production of the single.

"Hope of the Ages" peaked at No. 49 on the US Hot Christian Songs chart.

Background
"Hope of the Ages" is a collaborative single by Hillsong Worship, Reuben Morgan and Cody Carnes on 20 August 2021. Morgan shared the story behind the song in CCM Magazine.

Composition

Reception

Critical response
Jonathan Andre of 365 Days of Inspiring Media gave a positive review of "Hope of the Ages".

Accolades

Commercial performance
"Hope of the Ages" debuted at number 49 on the US Hot Christian Songs chart dated 4 September 2021.

Music video
Hillsong Worship published the official music video of "Hope of the Ages" on YouTube on 19 August 2021.

Personnel
Credits adapted from AllMusic.

 Cody Carnes — primary artist
 Garrett Davis — A&R
 Andrea García — A&R
 Bruno Gruel — mastering engineer
 Hillsong Worship — primary artist
 Jason Ingram — executive producer, producer
 Brooke Ligertwood — executive producer, producer
 Sean Moffitt — mixing
 Reuben Morgan — primary artist
 Johnny Rays — management

Charts

Release history

References

External links
 

2021 songs
2021 singles
Hillsong Worship songs
Cody Carnes songs
Songs written by Cody Carnes